Pang Tong (179–214), courtesy name Shiyuan, was a key adviser to the warlord Liu Bei in the late Eastern Han dynasty of China. In his youth, Pang Tong was disregarded because he was plain looking, however Sima Hui highly esteemed him calling him the "Crown of Scholars in Jing Province". He studied under him along with Zhuge Liang, Xu Shu and Xiang Lang and was given the nickname of "Fledgling Phoenix". Because of his friendly attitude, he worked as an appraiser in Nan Commandery. When reviewing someone, he would prioritize their virtue over their abilities and would encourage them to help others.

He briefly served Zhou Yu and befriended Lu Ji, Gu Shao and Quan Cong before joining Liu Bei after the latter became the provincial governor in 210. Under the recommendation of both Lu Su and Zhuge Liang, Liu Bei appointed him to Assistant Officer and promoted him to Military Adviser Generals of the Household. He advised Liu Bei to take over Yi Province accompanied him on his campaign (covering present-day Sichuan and Chongqing) against the warlord Liu Zhang, but was killed by a stray arrow during a battle at Luo County (north of present-day Guanghan, Sichuan) in 214.

Early life
Pang Tong was from Xiangyang Commandery, Jing Province. In his youth, he looked plain and simple, so he was not highly regarded. When he reached adulthood (around 19 years old), he visited Sima Hui, who was famous for spotting and recommending men of talent. They came to a mulberry tree, where Sima Hui climbed up to get the fruit while Pang Tong sat below, and they chatted for a whole day until nightfall. Sima Hui felt that Pang Tong was an extraordinary person and called Pang the "Crown of Sholars in Jing Province" (南州士之冠冕). Subsequently, Pang Tong started gaining more recognition among the scholar-gentry. Along with Zhuge Liang who was nicknamed "Crouching Dragon" (臥龍) and Sima Hui who was nicknamed "Water Mirror" (水鏡). Pang Tong was nicknamed "Fledgling Phoenix" (鳳雛; also translated as "Young Phoenix") by his uncle Pang Degong (龐德公).

Pang Tong's uncle was also from Xiangyang. He was an acquaintance of Zhuge Liang who showed him great respect always bowing deeply before him when he visited his house. While Pang Degong was crossing the Mian to pay respect and tributes along with sacrifices to his ancestor's tomb, Sima Hui visited his house therefore he called Pang Degong's wife and children then told them to prepare the meal for an important guest only known from Xu Shu that would come to see him and Pang Degong. Pang Degong's wife and children respectfully followed his instructions. Soon Pang Degong was back and stood in attention for the meeting even though he did not know who the guest was. There relation was as close as family and there was no difference between guest and host. Sima Hui was ten years younger than Pang Degong therefore he treated him as an older brother. Calling him affectionately Lord Pang (龐公) to the point where people thought that Lord Pang (Pang Gong) was his courtesy name although it wasn't true.

Pang Degong's son, Pang Shanmin (龐山民) also enjoyed a good reputation and married Zhuge Liang's youngest elder sister, later was summoned as a Gate Appointment Gentleman (黃門吏) but he died young. His son Pang Huan (龐渙), whose courtesy name was Shìwen (世文) between the years 280 and 289 became Administrator of Zangke (牂牁太守). While he was young Pang Tong didn't have anyone take note of him and only Pang Degong valued him highly. When he was eighteen years, he was sent to meet Sima Hui. After Sima Hui talked with him, he sighed and said: “Pang Degong really knows how to judge people. This is truly a boy of majestic moral character.”

Service as appraiser
Pang Tong later served as an Officer of Merit (功曹) in Nan Commandery (南郡; around present-day Jiangling County, Hubei). By nature, Pang Tong was sociable and diligent in fostering and mentoring. Hence, he was nominated to be an appraiser. When he reviewed people, he focused more on their personal virtues rather than their abilities. He was fond of ethical lessons and consistently strove to maintain high moral standards. He usually overpraised when he was asked to assess a person.

At times, people were puzzled so they questioned him on why he did that, to which he replied:

Service under Zhou Yu
In 209, Zhou Yu, a general under the warlord Sun Quan, occupied Nan Commandery after the Battle of Jiangling. After Zhou Yu was appointed as the Administrator (太守) of Nan Commandery, Pang Tong served as an official under him. When Zhou Yu died in 210, Pang Tong escorted his coffin back to Jiangdong and attended his funeral. Many of the officials in Jiangdong heard of his reputation. When he returned to Jing province, all of them gathered at the Western Gate (昌門). Among them, Pang Tong met and befriended Lu Ji, Gu Shao and Quan Cong. He also appraised each of them separately and described Lu Ji as "a horse that cannot run fast but has strong willpower", and Gu Shao as "an ox that is physically weak but capable of bearing burdens over great distances". Then he compared Quan Cong to Fan Zizhao (樊子昭) of Runan describing him as someone generous who admire respectable men. They were very pleased with his comments.

Someone then asked Pang Tong: "Does that mean Lu Ji is better than Gu Shao?" Pang Tong replied: "Although a horse can run fast, it can only bear the weight of one person. An ox can travel 300 li a day; it can certainly bear more than just the weight of one person!" Gu Shao later asked Pang Tong: "You are also known for being a good judge of character. Between us, who do you think is the better one?" Pang Tong replied: "I am not as good as you in associating with people and assessing their characters. However, when it comes to politics and strategy, it seems that I am one day ahead of you." Gu Shao agreed with Pang Tong and developed a close bond with him. Before Pang Tong left, Lu Ji and Gu Shao told him: "When peace is restored in the Empire, we want to have a good discussion with you about famous people." Both of them became close friends with Pang Tong.

Serving Liu Bei in Jing Province
Pang Tong became a subject of Liu Bei after the latter became the Governor of Jingzhou in 210. He initially served as an Assistant Officer (從事) and as the county magistrate (縣令) of Leiyang, but was later dismissed from office due to poor performance. Sun Quan's general Lu Su wrote to Liu Bei, recommending Pang Tong as a great talent that should be employed to important tasks and not managing a small territory. Liu Bei's strategist Zhuge Liang also recommended Pang Tong, so Liu Bei met with him, was greatly impressed and entrusted him with important matters. He recruited Pang to be an Assistant Officer in the Headquarters Office (治中從事). Liu Bei's treatment towards Pang Tong was second to that of Zhuge Liang. He later appointed both Pang Tong and Zhuge Liang as Military Adviser Generals of the Household (軍師中郎將).

While making merry during a feast, Liu Bei asked Pang Tong: "You once worked as Zhou Gongjin’s officer of merit. Before when I went to Wu, I heard that he secretly pressed Zhongmou (Sun Quan) to detain me. Is it true? When a man is with his lord, he must be utterly honest with him." Pang Tong admit that it was true. Liu Bei then sighed and said: "At this moment, I was in danger and they rescued me hence I could not refuse their invitation and almost failed to escape Zhou Yu's grasp! In this world, men of talent and wisdom can see through each other's plan. Before I left, Kongming protested against this with all his will. He has seen through this. However I didn't listen because I was thinking that I was Zhongmou's defense against the north and that he would need my help. I had no doubts about him. This was trule entering into the tiger's den and a very risky plan."

Assisting Liu Bei in the conquest of Yi Province

Around 210s, Pang Tong convinced Liu Bei to seize Yi Province (covering present-day Sichuan and Chongqing) and use its resources to compete with his rival Cao Cao for supremacy over China. Pang Tong said : Liu Bei answered : Pang Tong replied : Liu Bei heeded Pang Tong's suggestion.

In 211, Liu Bei led an army from Jing Province into Yi Province on the pretext of helping Yi Province's governor, Liu Zhang, counter an invasion from the warlord Zhang Lu in Hanzhong Commandery. Zhuge Liang remained behind to guard Jing Province while Pang Tong followed Liu Bei to Yi Province. Liu Zhang received Liu Bei at Fu County (涪縣; present-day Mianyang, Sichuan). Pang Tong urged Liu Bei to use the opportunity to capture Liu Zhang and force him to hand over Yi Province, but Liu Bei refused because he was new to Yi Province and had not established a strong foundation there yet. Liu Zhang later returned to Yi Province's capital, Chengdu.

Advising Liu Bei against Liu Zhang
Pang Tong outlined three plans for Liu Bei to choose from:
The upper plan: Select the best soldiers to form an elite force and advance quickly towards Chengdu, and force Liu Zhang to surrender and hand over Yi Province. Pang Tong also believed that Liu Zhang was not competent in military affairs and was unprepared, so the chances of success were high. Pang Tong considered this to be the best plan.
The middle plan: Knowing that Yang Huai (楊懷) and Gao Pei (高沛) were famous generals who led strong troops defending Guantou, and that in the past they had advised Liu Zhang to send Liu Bei back to Jing Province. Before the army advances, spread false news that Liu Bei was returning to Jing Province saying that the region was in danger and that Liu Bei need to rescue it while making it look like the army will leave. With Liu Bei's reputation and wanting to see him leave, they would certainly come see him off with light cavalry away from the fortified mountain passes they were defending, kill them and take control of their positions and troops, and finally advance towards Chengdu.
The lower plan: Retreat to Baidicheng and wait for another opportunity to attack. Pang Tong considered this to be the worst plan.

Pang Tong told Liu Bei that if he took too much time and didn't go then he would be in great danger and couldn't last. Liu Bei chose the middle plan and executed it – he killed Yang Huai and Gao Pei, led his forces towards Chengdu and conquered several of Liu Zhang's territories along the way.

Disagreement over Liu Bei's behavior during the campaign
When Liu Bei expressed joy during a banquet in Fu County to celebrate his success saying that today should be a merry day, Pang Tong chided him, saying that "celebrating the invasion of others' territory isn't what a man of ren (benevolence) should do". The drunk Liu Bei retorted angrily, "King Wu of Zhou also rejoiced after his victory over King Zhou of Shang. Is he not an example of a man of ren? You're wrong, so get out now!" After Pang Tong left, Liu Bei regretted what he said so he invited Pang back. Pang Tong returned to his seat and did not say anything, acting as usual, so Liu Bei asked, "When that quarrel happened just now, whose fault do you think it was?" Pang Tong replied, "It was both yours and mine." Liu Bei laughed and the banquet continued.

Xi Zuochi commented on this event and said :

Pei Songzhi added :

Death

Pang Tong later participated in a battle against Liu Zhang's forces at Luo County (雒縣; north of present-day Guanghan, Sichuan). He died after being hit by a stray arrow in the midst of battle. He was 36 years old (by East Asian age reckoning) at the time of his death. Liu Bei was deeply saddened by Pang Tong's death and he would weep whenever Pang Tong was mentioned. Pang Tong was posthumously made a Secondary Marquis (關內侯) after Liu Bei became emperor and established the state of Shu Han in 221. In October or November 260, Liu Bei's son and successor, Liu Shan, honoured Pang Tong with the posthumous title "Marquis Jing" (靖侯).

Liu Bei had a shrine and tomb constructed for Pang Tong near Luo County. The shrine and tomb is located in present-day Baimaguan Town (白馬關鎮), Luojiang County, Sichuan. On 25 May 2006, it became a Major Historical and Cultural Site Protected at the National Level.

Tang Geng about Pang Tong's death
Tang Geng (唐庚), a scholar from the Song dynasty, in his work called the "Three Kingdoms Miscellaneous Cases" (三國雜事), lamented over the young age at which Pang Tong died, recalling that while Zhuge Liang and Pang Tong were classmates, by the time Zhuge Liang died at a relatively young age of 53, Pang Tong himself was already dead since 20 years. He then commented on the fact that the year 219 when Liu Bei took the title of "King of Hanzhong" was also the year Guan Yu died. Next year, in 220 Huang Zhong and Fa Zheng died. Next year, in 221 Zhang Fei died. Next year, in 222 Ma Chao and Ma Liang died.

Before the foundation has been complete, each of those heroes were lost one following the other as if they were being stolen away. Next year, in 223 when Liu Shan took the imperial throne. Among the veterans, only Zhuge Liang and Zhao Yun were left. Seven years later and Zhao Yun was dead in 229 while Zhuge Liang died five years later in 234. At this time, all of those who achieved past glory (勳舊) were gone.

Fa Zheng barely reached 44 years old, Ma Chao 46 years old and Ma Liang 34 years old. Zhang Fei was said to be younger than both Liu Bei and Guan Yu; since Guan Yu was several years older than him, he must have been around fifty or so when he died. Huo Jun died when he was just 39 years old.

All of these outstanding individuals are born with great talents yet live a short life; all while Qiao Zhou lived to be more than seventy years old. With this, it should be clear to anyone that Heaven no longer favour the Han.

Family and descendants
After Pang Tong's death, Liu Bei appointed Pang's father – whose name was not recorded in history – as a Consultant (議郎) and later promoted him to a Counsellor Remonstrant (諫議大夫). Zhuge Liang treated him with great respect.

Pang Tong had a younger brother, Pang Lin (龐林), who served as an Assistant Officer in Jing Province's Headquarters Office (荊州治中從事). He participated in the Battle of Xiaoting in 221–222 alongside the general Huang Quan and was in charge of defending the northern flank from possible attacks by Shu's rival state, Wei. After Liu Bei lost to Sun Quan's general Lu Xun at the Battle of Xiaoting, Pang Lin and Huang Quan were separated from Liu Bei's remaining forces and could not return to Shu, so they brought along their troops and surrendered to Wei. Pang Lin served as the Administrator (太守) of Julu Commandery (鉅鹿郡) in Wei and received a marquis title.

Pang Lin's wife was the sister of Xi Zhen, In 208, she was separated from Pang Lin when the warlord Cao Cao invaded Jing Province and occupied Xiangyang. She only managed to reunite with Pang Lin in 222 when he and Huang Quan defected to Wei after the Battle of Xiaoting. During those 14 years of separation, she remained faithful to her husband and raised their daughter on her own. The Wei emperor Cao Pi praised her for her virtues and awarded her gifts.

Pang Tong had a son, Pang Hong (龐宏), whose courtesy name was Jushi (巨師). Pang Hong, who served in the Shu government, was known for being frugal, upright and outspoken. He offended Chen Di (陳袛), the Prefect of the Masters of Writing (尚書令). Chen Di found fault with Pang Hong and blocked him from getting promoted. He died in office while serving as the Administrator (太守) of Fuling Commandery (涪陵郡).

Appraisal
Chen Shou, who wrote Pang Tong's biography in the Sanguozhi, appraised Pang as follows: "Pang Tong was charming and good when associating with others. He diligently studied the classics, from this pondered his planning. During his time, people from Jing and Yi provinces thought he was an exceptional talent. In comparison with officials from (Cao) Wei, if Pang Tong was akin to Xun Yu and Xun You then Fa Zheng should be comparable to Cheng (Yu) and Guo (Jia).

Yang Xi wrote an appraisal on Pang Tong as follows: "The Military Adviser showed brightly, both extreme elegance and virtue. He devoted his life to clear his Master's path, loyal to his feelings and always delivered his opinion. But for all those righteousness actions, in response to virtue he received death."

In Romance of the Three Kingdoms
Pang Tong appears as a character in the 14th-century historical novel Romance of the Three Kingdoms, which romanticises the historical events before and during the Three Kingdoms period. In the novel, Pang Tong is portrayed as a brilliant military strategist who equals Zhuge Liang. Sima Hui recommends Pang Tong and Zhuge Liang as talents to aid Liu Bei by saying, "Hidden Dragon and Young Phoenix. If you can get either of them, you'll be able to pacify the empire."

In Chapter 47, before the Battle of Red Cliffs, Jiang Gan recommends Pang Tong to Cao Cao. Pang Tong presents a "chain links strategy" (連環計) to Cao. The plan involves linking Cao Cao's battleships together with strong iron chains to make the ships more stable when they were sailing, as well as to reduce the chances of Cao's soldiers falling seasick due to excessive rocking. This leads to Cao Cao's defeat as his battleships are unable to separate from each other during the fire attack, and when one ship is set aflame, the other ships linked to it catch fire as well.

Pang Tong's death during the war between Liu Bei and Liu Zhang is highly dramatised in Chapter 63. At the outset of the battle at Luo County, before Liu Bei and Pang Tong split forces for a two-pronged attack, Pang Tong's horse rears and throws him off its back. This is seen as a bad omen. Liu Bei then let Pang Tong borrow his famous steed, Dilu (的盧). However, Dilu is believed to bring bad luck to its rider despite having saved Liu Bei's life earlier. Liu Zhang's general Zhang Ren, who plans an ambush near Luo County, recognises Dilu and mistakes its rider to be Liu Bei, so he orders his archers to fire at the rider. Pang Tong is hit by several arrows which pierce through his body and he dies on the spot. His place of death is called "Valley of the Fallen Phoenix".

In popular culture

Pang Tong is featured as a playable character in Koei's Dynasty Warriors, Warriors Orochi and Dynasty Tactics video game series.

Pang Tong is the sixth of the eight genius students of Master Water Mirror in The Ravages of Time manhua.

See also
 Lists of people of the Three Kingdoms

Notes

References

Citations from the Sanguozhi

Citations from the Sanguozhi zhu

Other citations

Bibliography
 Chen, Shou (3rd century). Records of the Three Kingdoms (Sanguozhi).
 Pei, Songzhi (5th century). Annotations to Records of the Three Kingdoms (Sanguozhi zhu).
 
 
 Luo, Guanzhong (14th century). Romance of the Three Kingdoms (Sanguo Yanyi).

179 births
214 deaths
Deaths by arrow wounds
Han dynasty politicians from Hubei
Han dynasty people killed in battle
Officials under Liu Bei